Tris(2-pyridylmethyl)amine (abbreviated TPMA or TPA) is an organic compound with the formula (C5H4NCH2)3N.  It is a tertiary amine with three picolyl substituents.  It is a white solid that is soluble in polar organic solvents.  It is a ligand in coordination chemistry.

The ligand is prepared by the alkylation of 2-picolylamine by picolyl chloride:
2 C5H4NCH2Cl  +  C5H4NCH2NH2   →  (C5H4NCH2)3N  +  2 HCl

TPMA is a tripodal ligand, often used to simulate the coordination environment within some proteins. It is also used as a copper ligand in ATRP.

Related ligands
dipicolylamine, an intermediate in the synthesis of TPMA.
2-picolylamine, a bidentate ligand, also known as aminomethylpyridine.

References

Tripodal ligands
Amines
2-Pyridyl compounds